Tappal is a town, nearby city of Aligarh in Khair Tehsil, Aligarh district in the Indian state of Uttar Pradesh. It is close to the Yamuna Expressway. It is located on Aligarh-Palwal NH 22A and also connected with yamuna expressway which connects Greater Noida to Agra.

Villages in Aligarh district